Willy Clarisse Elvire Hector, Viscount De Clercq (8 July 1927 – 28 October 2011) was a Belgian liberal politician.

De Clercq was born in Ghent, son of Frans de Clercq. After his law and notariat studies at the University of Ghent and a scholarship at Syracuse University (Syracuse, United States), De Clerq became a lawyer at the Court of appeal in Ghent and a professor at Ghent University and the Vrije Universiteit Brussel. Although he could have had a successful career in law, he got into politics. He was member of the Liberal youth and was elected municipal councillor and member of parliament.

De Clercq served in various coalition governments. He was secretary of state for the budget (1960–1961), deputy prime minister and minister of the budget from 1966 to 1968, deputy prime minister and Minister of Finance in 1973–1974, Minister of Finance in 1974–1977, and deputy prime minister in 1980.

De Clercq served as president of various international monetary instances and as president of the then liberal party PVV. He served for a term as a member of the European Commission (1985–1989). Moreover, he became Minister of State in 1985. From 1989 to 2004, he was a member of the European Parliament.

In 2003, he created together with other prominent European personalities the Medbridge Strategy Center, whose goal is to promote dialogue and mutual understanding between Europe and the Middle-East.<ref>{{Cite web |url=http://www.medbridge.org/showpage.php/en/1/2/page.html |title=' + ((text!=)?text:'...') + ' |access-date=22 September 2010 |archive-date=10 October 2008 |archive-url=https://web.archive.org/web/20081010175025/http://www.medbridge.org/showpage.php/en/1/2/page.html |url-status=live }}</ref>

He died on 28 October 2011.

 Honours 
 Created viscount de Clercq by Royal Decree in 2006.
 Minister of State by Royal Decree.
 Grand Cordon in the Order of Leopold.
 Knight Grand Cross in the Order of the Crown.
 Knight Grand Cross in the Order of the Oak Crown.
 Knight Grand Cross in the Order of Merit of the Federal Republic of Germany.
 Knight Grand Cross in the Order of Merit of the Italian Republic.
 Knight Grand Cross in the Order of the White Rose of Finland.
 Grand officer  in the Legion of Honour.

 Varia 
He was the father of jonkheer Yannick De Clercq and 
grandfather of jonkheer Mathias De Clercq.

References

Sources
 W. Prevenier, C. Ysebaert, L. Pareyn (Ed.), Vijftig jaar liberale praxis. Willy De Clercq vijfenzeventig jaar'', 2002.
 T. Goorden, Willy De Clercq, een biografie, Lannoo, 2004,

External links
 medbridge.org

|-

|-

|-

1927 births
2011 deaths
Belgian European Commissioners
Belgian Ministers of State
Finance ministers of Belgium
Ghent University alumni
MEPs for Belgium 1989–1994
MEPs for Belgium 1994–1999
MEPs for Belgium 1999–2004
Open Vlaamse Liberalen en Democraten politicians
Syracuse University alumni
Viscounts of Belgium
Recipients of the Grand Cross of the Order of Leopold II
Grand Crosses 1st class of the Order of Merit of the Federal Republic of Germany
European Commissioners 1985–1988